= HD 127726 =

Binary star system in the constellation Boötes

Observation data Epoch J2000 Equinox ICRS
- Constellation: Boötes
- Right ascension: 14^{h} 32^{m} 20.22613^{s}
- Declination: +26° 40′ 38.224″
- Apparent magnitude (V): 5.88 (6.61 + 7.08)‍

Characteristics
- Spectral type: A7Vn + F0
- U−B color index: +0.08
- B−V color index: +0.21

Astrometry
Radial velocity (R_{v})	−4 km/s
Proper motion (μ)	RA: −69.68 mas/yr Dec.: −21.90 mas/yr
Parallax (π)	13.58±0.69 mas
Distance	240 ± 10 ly (74 ± 4 pc)
Absolute magnitude (M_{V})	2.27 + 2.74

Orbit
Period (P)	29.93 yr
Semi-major axis (a)	0.200″
Eccentricity (e)	0.160
Inclination (i)	158.0°
Longitude of the node (Ω)	23.3°
Periastron epoch (T)	B 1983.85
Argument of periastron (ω) (secondary)	57.0°

Details

A
Mass	1.64 M_{☉}
Rotational velocity (v sin i)	205 km/s

B
Mass	1.46 M_{☉}

Other designations
- BD+27°2388, HD 127726, HIP 71094, HR 5433, SAO 83394

Database references
SIMBAD	data

HD 127726 is a binary star system in the northern constellation of Boötes. The pair consist of a rapidly-rotating A-type main-sequence star and a fainter F-type companion, orbiting each other with a period of 29.93 years and an orbital eccentricity (ovalness) of 0.16. They have a combined apparent visual magnitude of 5.88, which is bright enough to be dimly visible to the naked eye. The system is located at a distance of approximately 240 light years from the Sun.

A third star, 4.26" from HD 127726 and magnitude 6.0, shares a common proper motion although any orbit would be thousands of years long.
